In coding theory, the Zyablov bound is a lower bound on the rate  and relative distance  that are achievable by concatenated codes.

Statement of the bound
The bound states that there exists a family of -ary (concatenated, linear) codes with rate  and relative distance  whenever

,

where is the -ary entropy function

.

Description
The bound is obtained by considering the range of parameters that are obtainable by concatenating a "good" outer code  with a "good" inner code .  Specifically, we suppose that the outer code meets the Singleton bound, i.e. it has rate and relative distance  satisfying .  Reed Solomon codes are a family of such codes that can be tuned to have any rate  and relative distance  (albeit over an alphabet as large as the codeword length).  We suppose that the inner code meets the Gilbert–Varshamov bound, i.e. it has rate and relative distance  satisfying .  Random linear codes are known to satisfy this property with high probability, and an explicit linear code satisfying the property can be found by brute-force search (which requires time polynomial in the size of the message space).

See Figure 1 for a plot of this bound.

Note that the Zyablov bound implies that for every , there exists a (concatenated) code with positive rate and positive relative distance.

Remarks
We can construct a code that achieves the Zyablov bound in polynomial time. In particular, we can construct explicit asymptotically good code (over some alphabets) in polynomial time.

Linear Codes will help us complete the proof of the above statement since linear codes have polynomial representation.

We need to construct the Inner code that lies on Gilbert-Varshamov bound. This can be done in two ways

This is because Varshamovs bound states that there exists a linear code that lies on Gilbert-Varshamon bound which will take  time.
To construct  in  time and use  time overall. This can be achieved by using the method of conditional expectation on the proof that random linear code lies on the bound with high probability.

Thus we can construct a code that achieves the Zyablov bound in polynomial time.

See also
 Singleton bound
 Gilbert-Varshamov bound

References and External Links
MIT Lecture Notes on Essential Coding Theory – Dr. Madhu Sudan 
University at Buffalo Lecture Notes on Coding Theory – Dr. Atri Rudra
University of Washington Lecture Notes on Coding Theory- Dr. Venkatesan Guruswami

Error detection and correction
Coding theory
Finite fields
Information theory